Heteromurus is a genus of slender springtails in the family Entomobryidae. There are at least three described species in Heteromurus.

Species
 Heteromurus margaritarius Wankel, 1860
 Heteromurus nitidus (Templeton, 1835)
 Heteromurus tenuicornis Borner, 1906

References

Springtail genera